Wally McArthur (1 December 1933 – 28 August 2015) was an Aboriginal Australian rugby league footballer and track and field athlete. In 2008, the centenary of rugby league in Australia, he was named in the Aboriginal Australian rugby league team of the Century.

McArthur was born in 1933 in Borroloola in the Northern Territory, before he moved down to Adelaide, South Australia, in the early 1950s, where he lived at St Francis House boys boarding home and became a noted short-distance runner.

McArthur was also interested in playing Australian rules football, but was denied this because of a "colour bar". Rugby historian Sean Fagan and Australian journalist John Pilger have claimed that McArthur was not selected for the Australian track team at the 1952 Summer Olympics because of racial discrimination, but this has been disputed.

McArthur played in the South Australian Rugby League and Western Australia Rugby League before moving to England to play a total of 165 games with Rochdale Hornets, Blackpool Borough, Salford and Workington Town.

References

External links
 "The Wally McArthur Story" at http://www.johnpilger.com

1933 births
2015 deaths
Australian rugby league players
Blackpool Borough players
Indigenous Australian rugby league players
Rochdale Hornets players
Salford Red Devils players
Workington Town players